Neil Billingsley (1970–present) is a former child actor from the seventies and eighties and financial consultant. He was born in New York City. His four siblings were also child actors, most notably Peter Billingsley and Melissa Michaelsen.

Career 
In 1975, Neil began playing Danny Walton on the daytime soap opera Search for Tomorrow. His role lasted several years. The role was taken over by Cain Devore and later John Loprieno. Besides numerous roles in commercials, and guest shots on TV series like Father Murphy, Neil also starred in TV movies such as Million Dollar Infield and Shattered Innocence (which also featured sister Melissa and A Christmas Story's Melinda Dillon). During the third season of The All New Mickey Mouse Club, Neil played a character named Dave on the four episode serial Just Perfect. Following his acting career, Neil graduated from Arizona State University and entered the world of finance. Now using the last name Michaelsen, Neil has worked for TM Capital and for APS Financial Corporation. He currently is involved with Triple Tap Ventures in Houston, Texas, which operates Alamo Drafthouse Theaters in Texas.

References 

American male child actors
American male soap opera actors
Living people
1970 births